Route 329 is a provincial highway in the Laurentides and Lanaudière regions of Quebec, serving a large portion of the popular tourist area as well as numerous lakes and cottage areas in the Middle and Upper Laurentians. Beginning at the junction of Route 148 just east of Lachute, it ends 93 kilometers further north at the junction of Route 125 in Saint-Donat, just south of Mont-Tremblant National Park. It is briefly concurrent with Route 364 in Morin-Heights and Route 117 in Sainte-Agathe-des-Monts.

Municipalities along Route 329
 Lachute
 Gore
 Mille-Isles
 Morin-Heights
 Saint-Adolphe-d'Howard
 Sainte-Agathe-des-Monts
 Lantier
 Saint-Donat

Major intersections

See also
 List of Quebec provincial highways

References

External links
 Transports Quebec Map 
 Route 329 on Google Maps

329